Oran was a state constituency in Perlis, Malaysia, that was represented in the Perlis State Legislative Assembly from 1974 to 1995.

The state constituency was created in the 1974 redistribution and was mandated to return a single member to the Perlis State Legislative Assembly under the first past the post voting system. Its last election was in 1990. It disappeared in the 1995 election.

History
It was abolished in 1995 after it was redistributed.

Representation history

Election results

References

Defunct Perlis state constituencies